An expression-oriented programming language is a programming language in which every (or nearly every) construction is an expression and thus yields a value.  The typical exceptions are macro definitions, preprocessor commands, and declarations, which expression-oriented languages often treat as statements.

Lisp and ALGOL 68 are expression-oriented languages. Pascal is not an expression-oriented language.

All functional programming languages are expression-oriented.

Criticism and prevention

Critics, including language designers, blame expression-orientation for an entire class of programming mistakes wherein a programmer accidentally codes an assignment expression, which replaces a variable with an expression rather than testing it for equality with that expression.

The designers of Ada and Java prevent this type of mistake by restricting control expressions to those that evaluate strictly to the boolean data type.

The designers of Python implemented assignment as a statement rather than an expression, thus prohibiting assignment from nesting inside any other statement or expression. (Until version 3.8 added 'assignment expressions', with a different syntax.)

In some expression-oriented languages, expressions that merely cause side effects return void types.

Examples

ALGOL 68
BLISS
Icon
Lisp
ML
Perl
Rebol
Ruby
Elixir
Erlang
Haskell
Rust
Scala
Kotlin
OCaml

See also
Command–query separation
Functional programming

References

Programming language classification